Cita's World is a video music show that originally aired on BET from September 20, 1999 until January 3, 2003.

Overview
It was the first show to feature a virtual reality Black character as the host named Cita. Cita's World was the brainchild of Curtis A. Gadson, B.E.T. Senior VP of Programming at that time, & Corey Turner, concept designer and director. The show moved production locations 3 times. The first year, the show was produced and shot in BET's headquarters in Washington, DC. The second year the show was moved to Harlem in BET's newly rented space. The Cita's World set and technical infrastructure sat next to the 106 & Park set.

The final year the show was moved to Burbank, CA, where the show was also given a major overhaul. New optical tracking motion capture to acquire Kittie's performances, its own dedicated stage for the blue screen set, and a remodeled and designed Cita. The show would benefit from the relocation to Los Angeles with staff that was already proficient in visual effects workflows and techniques.

Jam Zone
It was co-developed, produced and sometimes written by both Tracye Z. Kinzer and kittie KaBoom. The show ran from 1999 to 2003 in television. The show was originally named Jam Zone when it was created in 1997, which was just a wallpaper video show until 1999, when Cita emerged into the homes of millions.

Format
In between videos, Cita would talk to the viewers, answer viewer mail and offer her unadulterated opinions on current events, celebrities and more. The voice and motion of the Cita character was performed by kittie KaBoom. From Washington, D.C. to New York City to Hollywood, the shows content came from producer Tracye Kinzer, as well as kittie KaBoom and Writer, Cliff McBean. Tracye assigned her writers Cliff McBean, Monica "Monie Mon" Dyson, and Angela Yarborough and sometimes kittie topics as well as allowing them to generate their own ideas to create great entertainment.

Spin-off media
Due to the popularity of the show, BET published "Cita's World", which addresses the deluge of emails and letters sent to the show.
In 2021, after years of absence, Cita was redesigned and featured on BET Presents: The Encore.

References

External links
 

1990s American black cartoons
2000s American black cartoons
1999 American television series debuts
2003 American television series endings
1990s American adult animated television series
2000s American adult animated television series
1990s American music television series
2000s American music television series
American adult animated musical television series
American adult computer-animated television series
BET original programming